The Anglican Church of St Michael in Cudworth, Somerset, England was built in the 12th century. It is a Grade II* listed building.

History

The church was built in the 12th century, from which the north doorway and one small window remain. The nave and chancel are from the 13th century but were modified in the 14th and 15th.

The parish is part of the Winsmoor benefice within the Diocese of Bath and Wells.

Architecture

The stone building has hamstone dressing and slate roofs with a bell turret at the western end. It has a three-bay nave, two-bay chancel and a north aisle.

Inside the church are a Jacobean pulpit and 13th-century font. The cylindrical font has a band of chip-carved satires around the top and stands on a cylindrical stem.

There are some fragments of medieval stained glass.

See also
 List of ecclesiastical parishes in the Diocese of Bath and Wells

References

Grade II* listed buildings in South Somerset
Grade II* listed churches in Somerset
Church of England church buildings in South Somerset